The 1971 All-Ireland Junior Hurling Championship was the 50th staging of the All-Ireland Junior Championship since its establishment by the Gaelic Athletic Association in 1912.

London entered the championship as the defending champions.

The All-Ireland final was played on 7 November 1971 at the New Eltham Grounds in London, between London and Dublin, in what was their fourth meeting in the final and a first meeting in 11 years. London won the match by 1–09 to 0–09 to claim their fifth championship title overall and a third title in succession.

Results

All-Ireland Junior Football Championship

All-Ireland semi-finals

All-Ireland home final

All-Ireland final

References

Junior
All-Ireland Junior Football Championship